Legal  is a town in the Edmonton Metropolitan Region of Alberta, Canada within Sturgeon County.

Legal was established in 1894 as a Francophone community, and is named in honour of Bishop Émile-Joseph Legal. The town, the French Mural Capital of Canada, is known for its 28 murals.

Demographics 

In the 2016 Census of Population conducted by Statistics Canada, the Town of Legal recorded a population of 1,345 living in 448 of its 465 total private dwellings, a  change from its 2011 population of 1,225.

Education 
The Greater North Central Francophone Education Region No. 2 operates a francophone elementary/junior school in Legal named Citadelle School (École Citadelle), while Greater St. Albert Catholic Schools operates an English elementary/junior school.

Notable people 
 Paul Lorieau (1942–2013), – optician and national anthem singer for the Edmonton Oilers from 1981–2011.

See also 
List of communities in Alberta
List of towns in Alberta

References

External links 

1914 establishments in Alberta
Edmonton Metropolitan Region
Franco-Albertan culture
Towns in Alberta